The 2012 FIM Buckley Systems New Zealand Speedway Grand Prix was the first race of the 2012 Speedway Grand Prix season. It took place on 31 March at the Western Springs Stadium in Auckland, New Zealand.

The Grand Prix was won by defending world champion Greg Hancock, who beat Jarosław Hampel, Nicki Pedersen and Janson Crump in the final.

New Zealand SGP was first Grand Prix event in New Zealand, and second outside Europe, after 2002 Speedway Grand Prix of Australia.

Riders 

The Speedway Grand Prix Commission nominated Jason Bunyan as Wild Card, and Grant Tregoning and Andrew Aldridge both as Track Reserves. Sean Mason was renominated as a Reserve #18. The Draw was made on 30 March.

 (18)  Andrew Aldridge → (18)  Sean Mason

Results

Heat details 

1. British Jason Bunyan started with New Zealand license (MNZ).

Heat after heat 
 (65.07) Gollob, Bjerre, Sayfutdinov, Andersen
 (65.72) Jonsson, B. Pedersen, N. Pedersen, Bunyan
 (65.34) Lindbäck, Lindgren, Hampel, Ljung
 (65.37) Hancock, Crump, Harris, Holder
 (65.84) Crump, Bjerre, Lindgren, Jonsson
 (66.07) N. Pedersen, Lindbäck, Andersen, Harris
 (65.63) Gollob, Hancock, Hampel, B. Pedersen
 (66.12) Holder, Sayfutdinov, Ljung, Bunyan
 (65.32) Hampel, N. Pedersen, Holder, Bjerre (R)
 (65.69) Hancock, Ljung, Andersen, Jonsson
 (66.15) Gollob, Lindgren, Harris, Bunyan
 (66.19) Sayfutdinov, Lindbäck, B. Pedersen, Crump
 (66.69) B. Pedersen, Harris, Ljung, Bjerre (R)
 (66.25) Hampel, Crump, Andersen, Bunyan
 (66.94) Lindbäck, Gollob, Jonsson, Holder
 (65.93) Hancock, N. Pedersen, Lindgren, Sayfutdinov (X)
 (67.18) Hancock, Lindbäck, Bunyan, Bjerre
 (67.00) Andersen, Lindgren, B. Pedersen, Holder
 (66.59) Gollob, Crump, N. Pedersen, Ljung
 (66.59) Hampel, Sayfutdinov, Harris, Jonsson (R)
 Semifinals:
 (66.25) Hampel, N. Pedersen, Gollob, Sayfutdinov
 (66.25) Crump, Hancock, Lindbaeck, Lindgren
 The Final:
 (66.06) Hancock, Hampel, N. Pedersen, Crump

The intermediate classification

See also 
 motorcycle speedway

References 

New Zealand
2012
Speed